Yemen Postal Authority is the national postal authority of Yemen. It has the sole privilege of providing domestic and international postal services such as letter post, parcel post, money orders, postal banking, EMS, fax, philately etc. The Ministry of Communications and Information Technologies supervises Yemen Post's activities.

See also
Postage stamps and postal history of Yemen

External links

Communications in Yemen
Philately of Yemen